Operation Blackstone was a part of Operation Torch, the Allied landings in North Africa during World War II. The operation called for American amphibious troops to land at and capture the French-held port of Safi in French Morocco. The landings were carried out by the 47th Infantry Regiment of the U.S. Army and took place on the morning of 8 November 1942 as part of a larger operation to capture Casablanca.

The landings from converted destroyers were mostly successful. They were initially conducted without covering fire, hoping that the French might not resist at all. When coastal batteries opened fire, the fleet returned fire. When commanding General Harmon arrived French snipers had pinned the assault troops (most of whom were in combat for the first time) on the beaches. Most of the landings occurred behind schedule; air support from the carriers destroyed a French convoy of trucks intended to reinforce the defenses.

Safi surrendered on the afternoon of 8 November, but sporadic resistance continued until 10 November when the remaining defenders were pinned down and the bulk of Harmon's forces raced to join the siege of Casablanca.

See also

 17th Armored Engineer Battalion
 82nd Armored Reconnaissance Battalion

References

 2d ARMORED DIVISION "Hell on Wheels" 
 waratlas.org 17th Armored Engineer Battalion
 ww2db.com Operation Torch -Operation Blackstone
  stamfordhistory.org Operation Torch -Operation Blackstone

Blackstone, Operation
Blackstone, Operation
Blackstone
Blackstone
1942 in Morocco